The 2014 North Carolina Tar Heels football team represented the University of North Carolina at Chapel Hill as a member of Coastal Division of the Atlantic Coast Conference (ACC) during the 2014 NCAA Division I FBS football season. The team was led by third-year head coach Larry Fedora and played their home games at Kenan Memorial Stadium. They finished the season 6–7 overall and 4–4 in ACC play to tie for third place in the Coastal Division. They were invited to the Quick Lane Bowl, where they lost to Rutgers.

Personnel
North Carolina head coach Larry Fedora entered his third year as the North Carolina's head coach for the 2014 season. Seth Littrell was hired to be the team's assistant head coach for offense and tight ends coach. Keith Heckendorf, formerly UNC’s player development assistant, became the team's quarterbacks coach. Larry Porter was hired to coach running backs and previously coached running backs at Arizona State, Louisiana State and Oklahoma State, among other schools, before spending the 2013 season at Texas. He also was the head coach at Memphis in 2010 and 2011.

Schedule

Game summaries

Liberty

San Diego State

East Carolina

Clemson

Virginia Tech

Notre Dame

Georgia Tech

Virginia

at Miami (FL)

Pittsburgh

Duke

NC State

Rutgers (Quick Lane Bowl)

Rankings

References

North Carolina
North Carolina Tar Heels football seasons
North Carolina Tar Heels football